Graikas is a mountain village in the municipal unit of Skillounta, Elis, Greece. In 2011 its population was 307. It is situated on a hillside, 3 km southeast of Gryllos, 8 km southeast of Krestena and 9 km northeast of Zacharo. The Greek National Road 76 passes north of the village. Graikas suffered damage from the 2007 Greek forest fires.

Population

See also
List of settlements in Elis

References

External links
Graikas at the GTP Travel Pages

Skillounta
Populated places in Elis